Palatal muscles may refer to: 
 Levator veli palatini
 Tensor veli palatini muscle
 Musculus uvulae
 Palatoglossus muscle
 Palatopharyngeus muscle